Albert Lee Martin (born November 24, 1967) is a former professional baseball left fielder. He played 12 seasons in Major League Baseball, mostly for the Pittsburgh Pirates. He also played one season in the KBO League.

Early life 
Martin graduated from John A. Rowland High School in Rowland Heights, California, in 1985.

Professional career 
Martin played for four teams in the majors: the Pittsburgh Pirates (1992–99), the San Diego Padres (2000), the Seattle Mariners (2000–01), and the Tampa Bay Devil Rays (2003). His best season was in 1996 when he hit .300 with 18 home runs and 72 RBIs. That year he also stole 38 bases. He played for the KBO's LG Twins in 2004.

Controversies 
Martin claimed to have played football at University of Southern California. In 2001, he compared a collision with Seattle teammate Carlos Guillén to the time he tried to tackle Michigan running back Leroy Hoard in 1986, when he was playing strong safety at Southern California. In actuality, USC and Michigan did not meet that year, and Martin was an outfielder in the Atlanta Braves' system at the time. Furthermore, USC has no record that Martin ever attended the university.

Martin also apparently falsely claimed to have been selected for the 1994 Major League Baseball All-Star Game but to have been unable to play due to injury, an inaccuracy which was published in the 2003 Tampa Bay Devil Rays media guide.

In 2000, Martin was involved in a domestic abuse incident with a woman named Shawn Haggerty. She told police that she was married to Martin, who was already married to another woman. Martin ultimately pleaded guilty to a domestic violence charge. After signing with the Seattle Mariners, he falsely told the Seattle Times that he had been exonerated from the charges.

See also
List of Major League Baseball career stolen bases leaders

References

External links

Baseball-Almanac.com – statistics page
Career statistics and player information from KBO League

Major League Baseball left fielders
Tampa Bay Devil Rays players
Pittsburgh Pirates players
Seattle Mariners players
San Diego Padres players
LG Twins players
Gulf Coast Braves players
Idaho Falls Braves players
Sumter Braves players
Burlington Braves players
Durham Bulls players
Greenville Braves players
Richmond Braves players
Buffalo Bisons (minor league) players
Carolina Mudcats players
KBO League outfielders
American expatriate baseball players in South Korea
Baseball players from California
African-American baseball players
Sportspeople from Los Angeles County, California
1967 births
Living people
21st-century African-American people
20th-century African-American sportspeople